Eric Devon Vance (born July 14, 1975 in Tampa, Florida) is a former American football defensive back in the National Football League. He was signed by the Carolina Panthers as an undrafted free agent in 1997. He played college football at Vanderbilt.

Vance also played for the Tampa Bay Buccaneers and Indianapolis Colts. Vance worked in Player Development for the Tampa Bay Buccaneers and was hired by Al Golden on April 4, 2013 to become Assistant Director of Football Operations at the University of Miami, and now is the defensive coordinator at his Alma mater L.D.Bell .

References

1975 births
Living people
American football cornerbacks
American football safeties
Vanderbilt Commodores football players
San Diego Chargers players
Tampa Bay Buccaneers players
Indianapolis Colts players